Athletics competitions at the 2011 ALBA Games were held at the Polideportivo Máximo Viloria in Barquisimeto, Venezuela, between July 27-30, 2011.

A total of 43 events were contested, 22 by men and 21 by women.

Medal summary
Medal winners and complete results were published.  Some wind info was retrieved.

Men

Women

Medal table
The medal table was published.

Participation (unofficial)
An unofficial count yields the participation of athletes from the following 11 countries:

References

Athletics at the ALBA Games
International athletics competitions hosted by Venezuela
2011 in athletics (track and field)
2011 in Venezuelan sport